Central Tibetan, also known as Dbus, Ü or Ü-Tsang, is the most widely spoken Tibetic language and the basis of Standard Tibetan.

Dbus and Ü are forms of the same name. Dbus is a transliteration of the name in Tibetan script, whereas Ü is the pronunciation of the same in Lhasa dialect,  (or ). That is, in Tibetan, the name is spelled Dbus and pronounced Ü. All of these names are frequently applied specifically to the prestige dialect of Lhasa.

Languages or dialects 
There are many mutually intelligible Central Tibetan languages besides that of Lhasa, with particular diversity along the border and in Nepal:

 Limi (Limirong), Mugum, Dolpo (Dolkha), Mustang (Lowa, Lokä), Humla, Nubri, Lhomi, Dhrogpai Gola, Walungchung Gola (Walungge/Halungge), Tseku
 Basum (most divergent, possibly a separate language)

Ethnologue reports that Walungge is highly intelligible with Thudam.

Glottolog reports these South-Western Tibetic languages as forming a separate subgroup of languages within Central Tibetan languages, but that Thudam is not a distinct variety. On the opposite, Glottolog does not classify Basum within Central Tibetan but leaves it unclassified within Tibetic languages.

Tournadre (2013) classifies Tseku with Khams.

Consonants 

 འ isn't commonly transliterated to Roman, in the Wade–Giles system ' is used.

Vowels 
ཨ（◌）

Pronunciation 

一"ai, ain, oi, oin" is also written to "ä, än, ö, ön".

Conjunct vowels

Last consonant

See also
Lhasa Tibetan
Amdo Tibetan
Ladakhi language
Balti language
Ü-Tsang

References

Languages of China
Languages of Nepal
Central Bodish languages
Languages of Tibet
Languages written in Tibetan script